Donald Duckett (1894–1970) was an English footballer who played for Bradford City, Halifax Town and Bradford Park Avenue. He was the nephew of Horace Duckett, who played international rugby for England.

References

1894 births
1970 deaths
People from Thornton and Allerton
English footballers
Bradford City A.F.C. players
Halifax Town A.F.C. players
Bradford (Park Avenue) A.F.C. players
Association footballers not categorized by position